The Legislative Assembly is the legislature of Montserrat. A unicameral body, it has nine elected members.

History
The Legislative Assembly was established following the promulgation of a new constitution in 2011, replacing the Legislative Council. The first elections to it were held in 2014, and the most recent being in 2019.

Electoral system
The nine members of the Legislative Assembly are elected in a single constituency, with voters having the opportunity to vote for up to nine candidates under plurality-at-large voting.

See also
List of speakers of the Legislative Assembly of Montserrat

References

Montserrat
Government of Montserrat
Politics of Montserrat
Montserrat